Tatalılar (also, Tatalylar, Tatarlar, and Titilyar) is a village and municipality in the Beylagan Rayon of Azerbaijan.  It has a population of 2,083.

References 

Populated places in Beylagan District